Below are the squads for the 2016 AFF Women's Championship, hosted by Myanmar, which is taking place between 26 July - 4 August 2016.

Group A

Philippines
Head coach: Buda Bautista

Singapore
Head coach: Chen Caiying

Thailand
Head coach:  Spencer Prior

Vietnam
Head coach: Mai Đức Chung

Group B

Australia U20
Head Coach: Craig Deans

Malaysia
Head coach: Asyraaf Abdullah

Myanmar
Head Coach:  Roger Reijners

Timor-Leste
Head coach: Gelasio da Silva Carvalho

References

Women's AFF Championship squads